Platyla gracilis is a species of gastropod belonging to the family Aciculidae.

The species is found in Central Europe.

The species has cosmopolitan distribution.

References

gracilis
Gastropods described in 1877
Cosmopolitan animals
Gastropods of Europe